Lieutenant-Colonel Robert George Grosvenor, 5th Duke of Westminster,  (24 April 1910 – 19 February 1979) was a British soldier, landowner, businessman and politician. In the 1970s he was the richest man in Britain.

Background and early life

Grosvenor was born Mr. Robert Grosvenor, younger son of Lord Hugh Grosvenor, himself the sixth son and tenth child of Hugh Grosvenor, 1st Duke of Westminster by his second wife, the Hon. Katherine Cavendish, daughter of William Cavendish, 2nd Baron Chesham. Grosvenor's mother, Lady Mabel Crichton, was the daughter of John Crichton, 4th Earl Erne.

Grosvenor was educated at Eton College, an all-boys public boarding school in Berkshire. He was a member of the school's contingent of the junior division of the Officer Training Corps. He reached the rank of cadet lance corporal.

Military career
On 28 June 1938, Grosvenor was commissioned into the 11th (City of London Yeomanry) Light Anti-Aircraft Brigade, a newly formed Territorial Army unit of the Royal Artillery, as a second lieutenant. He ended World War II as a war substantive major.

On 1 May 1947, he transferred to the reformed City of London Yeomanry (Rough Riders) and was promoted from his pre-war substantive rank of second lieutenant to major with seniority from 24 April 1944. His service number was 76151. He transferred to the North Irish Horse on 1 May 1949. On 11 November 1949, he was awarded the Efficiency Decoration (TD) for long service with the Territorial Army. He was promoted to lieutenant colonel on 15 February 1953. He was awarded a clasp to his Efficiency Decoration on 26 October 1954. On 14 February 1956, he moved from the Active List to the Territorial Army Reserve of Officers. He resigned his commission on 15 April 1960 and was permitted to retain the rank of lieutenant colonel.

Political career
Grosvenor lived in Northern Ireland most of his life at Ely Lodge, Blaney, on an island in the middle of Lough Erne. In 1952 he was appointed High Sheriff of Fermanagh.

In the 1955 general election, he was elected to Parliament as member for Fermanagh & South Tyrone. Re-elected in 1959, he retired in 1964, he was succeeded by his cousin, the Marquess of Hamilton. In parliament he stuck mainly to constituency issues, but was responsible for a bill to help increase adoptions, which became the Adoption Act 1964. He was described in his successor's maiden speech as popular and well-liked.

Peerage
At birth, as a son of the younger son of a peer, Grosvenor was entitled to no title or courtesy title at all. In 1963, his cousin William Grosvenor, 3rd Duke of Westminster died and Grosvenor's elder brother Gerald became 4th Duke. At this point, in view of the fact that he was likely to succeed his brother in the peerage, a Royal Warrant of Precedence was issued to allow Grosvenor to adopt the style of Lord Robert Grosvenor. Upon his brother's death in 1967, Robert duly became 5th Duke of Westminster. Although he took his seat in the House of Lords, he never spoke, something surprising in view of his political career. Westminster (as he was now known) was appointed honorary colonel of the North Irish Horse in 1971.

Personal life
On 3 December 1946, he married his second cousin, Hon. Viola Maud Lyttelton, a daughter of the 9th Viscount Cobham. They had three children, ten grandchildren and eleven great-grandchildren:
Lady Leonora Mary Grosvenor (b. 1 February 1949). She married Thomas Patrick Anson, 5th Earl of Lichfield on 8 March 1975 and they were divorced in 1986. They have three children and two grandsons. 
Gerald Cavendish Grosvenor, 6th Duke of Westminster (22 December 1951 – 9 August 2016). He married Natalia Phillips on 7 October 1978. They had four children and six grandchildren.
Lady Jane Meriel Grosvenor (b. 8 February 1953). She married Guy David Innes-Ker, 10th Duke of Roxburghe on 10 September 1977 and they were divorced in 1990. They have three children and three grandchildren. Lady Jane was presented to high society as a debutante at the prestigious International Debutante Ball at the Waldorf-Astoria Hotel in New York City in 1971.
Grosvenor died on 19 February 1979 at Ely Lodge near Enniskillen in Northern Ireland. He was buried in the churchyard of Eccleston Church near Eaton Hall, Cheshire.

References

External links

5th Duke of Westminster, ukdukes.co.uk. Accessed 28 December 2022.

1910 births
1979 deaths
Royal Artillery officers
British Army personnel of World War II
People from Cheshire
5
Lord-Lieutenants of Fermanagh
Grosvenor, Lord Robert
Robert Grosvenor, 5th Duke of Westminster
Grosvenor, Robert
Grosvenor, Robert
Ulster Unionist Party members of the House of Commons of the United Kingdom
High Sheriffs of County Fermanagh
Grosvenor, Lord Robert
Grosvenor, Lord Robert
Westminster, D5
North Irish Horse officers
City of London Yeomanry (Rough Riders) officers
People educated at Eton College
Northern Ireland justices of the peace
Ulster Unionist Party members of the Senate of Northern Ireland
Ulster Unionist Party hereditary peers